The 2017 Kansas City Chiefs season was the franchise's 48th season in the National Football League, the 55th as the Kansas City Chiefs, the 58th overall, the fifth under head coach Andy Reid, and first under general manager Brett Veach. They won the AFC West, but lost to Tennessee in the Wild Card round after blowing a 21-3 lead at the half. The season was the first to feature future two-time MVP and Super Bowl MVP Patrick Mahomes whose first start came in the last game of the regular season against the Denver Broncos, a game which had no playoff implications as the Chiefs had secured the division in Week 16. 

As of 2023, this represents the most recent season neither making nor hosting the AFC Championship game for the Chiefs.

Season notes
General manager John Dorsey was fired on June 22, 2017. On July 10, the Chiefs promoted co-director of player personnel Brett Veach to general manager. The only other personnel change for the Chiefs that occurred was co-offensive coordinator Brad Childress was promoted to assistant head coach, leaving Matt Nagy as the only offensive coordinator. The Chiefs most notable transaction of the off-season came when they released the franchise's all-time leading rusher, Jamaal Charles, after 9 seasons. After being released, Charles signed with the Chiefs division rival, the Denver Broncos.

Following the Atlanta Falcons 23–17 loss to the Buffalo Bills in Week 4, the Chiefs became the last undefeated team left in the NFL for the fourth time in team history, and the second time under Andy Reid, with the previous times being in 2003, 2010, and 2013. After their 5–0 start, the Chiefs lost 6 of their next 7 games, the lone win coming against the Broncos. During this stretch, the Chiefs offense struggled, leading to head coach Andy Reid giving play calling duties during games to offensive coordinator Matt Nagy.

After four straight losses, the Chiefs won three straight games to win the AFC West for the second consecutive season. It was the first time in franchise history that the Chiefs have won back-to-back division titles. It also marked the Chiefs qualifying for the playoffs three consecutive seasons, which they had not done since they made six consecutive playoff appearances from 1990 to 1995. They finished the season with a 10–6 record, earning the AFC's fourth seed in the playoffs. In the Wild Card round, they would lose to the Tennessee Titans 22–21. In the game, the Chiefs had a commanding 21–3 lead at halftime, but failed to score a single point in the second half. The loss extended their NFL record six straight home playoff losses. It was the second time under Andy Reid they lost a playoff game after being up by more than 10 points at halftime. The Chiefs have lost three consecutive playoff games, and have lost 11 of their last 12. The Chiefs first two wins of the season came against teams that eventually meet in Super Bowl LII to end the season. the New England Patriots and Philadelphia Eagles. Additionally by beating the Patriots in Week 1, the Chiefs extending their winning streak against the defending Super Bowl champs to six.

NFL Top 100
The Chiefs had 6 players ranked in NFL Network's annual Top 100 players list, which was tied for the 3rd most.

Transactions

Offseason

Reserve/future free agent contracts

Cuts

Free agents

Trades

Draft

Notes
 The Chiefs forfeited their original 6th round selection (what would have been the 211th overall selection) as part of their punishment for a violation of the NFL's Anti-Tampering policy during the  free agency period.
 The Chiefs traded their 1st round selection, (27th overall), their 3rd round selection (91st overall), and their 2018 1st round selection for the Buffalo Bills 1st round selection (10th overall)
 The Chiefs traded their 3rd round selection (104th overall), 4th round selection (132nd overall), and 7th round selection (245th overall) to the Minnesota Vikings for their 3rd round selection (86th overall)
 The Chiefs traded tight end James O'Shaughnessy and their 6th round selection (216th overall) to the New England Patriots for the Patriots 5th round selection (183rd overall)
 The Chiefs traded two 5th round selections (170th overall and 180th overall) to the Minnesota Vikings for their 4th round selection (139th overall)

Undrafted free agents

Players signed from rookie mini camp tryouts

Players cut in the offseason before playing for the Chiefs

Staff

Final roster

Preseason

Regular season

Schedule

Note: Intra-division opponents are in bold text.

Game summaries

Week 1: at New England Patriots
NFL Kickoff Game

Week 2: vs. Philadelphia Eagles

Week 3: at Los Angeles Chargers

Week 4: vs. Washington Redskins

Week 5: at Houston Texans

Week 6: vs. Pittsburgh Steelers

Week 7: at Oakland Raiders

Week 8: vs. Denver Broncos

During halftime, Carlos Carson was inducted into the Chiefs Ring of Honor.

Week 9: at Dallas Cowboys

This was the last time the Chiefs lost a game by more than 8 points until Super Bowl LV.

Week 11: at New York Giants

Week 12: vs. Buffalo Bills

Week 13: at New York Jets

Week 14: vs. Oakland Raiders

Week 15: vs. Los Angeles Chargers

Week 16: vs. Miami Dolphins

Week 17: at Denver Broncos

Standings

Division

Conference

Postseason

Schedule

Game summaries

AFC Wild Card Playoffs: vs. (5) Tennessee Titans

For the first round of the playoffs, the Chiefs played the Tennessee Titans at home. The Chiefs entered the game looking to win their first home playoff game since 1994, a streak of 5 straight home playoff losses. The Chiefs had a strong first half, building a 21–3 halftime lead and sending the home crowd into a frenzy. However, the Titans were able to catch fire, with a batted down touchdown pass from Marcus Mariota to himself, to make the score 21–10. The Chiefs were not able to recover after this touchdown, and the Titans outscored Kansas City 19–0 in the second half to win 22–21. The Chiefs, looked as though they had taken the lead on a fumble by Derrick Henry. However, the turnover was reviewed, and upon review, the call was overturned and Tennessee kept the ball. Henry was then able to run for a first down on third down to seal the game. With the loss, the Chiefs ended their season at 10–7 and lost 6 straight home playoff games, the worst in NFL history.

References

External links
 

Kansas City
Kansas City Chiefs seasons
Kansas City Chiefs
AFC West championship seasons